Logania is a genus of butterflies in the family Lycaenidae.

The genus is shared the between the Indomalayan realm and the Australasian realm, ranging from Burma to New Guinea.

Species
 Logania distanti Semper, 1889
 Logania dumoga Cassidy, 1995
 Logania hampsoni Frühstorfer, 1914
 Logania malayica Distant, 1884
 Logania marmorata Moore, 1884
 Logania nehalemia Frühstorfer, 1914
 Logania obscura (Röber, 1886)
 Logania paluana Eliot, 1986
 Logania regina Druce, 1873)
 Logania waltraudae Eliot, 1986
 Logania watsoniana de Nicéville, 1898

References
Logania at Markku Savela's website on Lepidoptera

 
Miletinae
Lycaenidae genera